Robbie Muirhead (born 8 March 1996) is a Scottish professional footballer, who plays as a forward for Greenock Morton.

Muirhead began his career with Kilmarnock before joining Dundee United in February 2015. After a loan spell with Partick Thistle between September 2015 to January 2016, Muirhead was released by Dundee United in April 2016, before signing for Heart of Midlothian. In 2017, he moved to Milton Keynes Dons, then spent a season at Dunfermline Athletic.

He has represented Scotland at all levels up to U19 level.

Early life
Born in Irvine, Scotland, Muirhead was known for playing football and golf locally, and was mentioned on several occasions in his local newspaper.
Muirhead is also the first and still the only boy to win both the West of Scotland Cup and Scottish Cup when representing Annanhill Primary School during year 6 and year 7 when he was Captain of the schools team.

Club career

Kilmarnock
Muirhead joined Kilmarnock academy before joining the first team. He made his professional league debut in the last game of the season, coming on as a substitute in the second half for Cillian Sheridan, in a 3–1 loss against St Mirren, which was Kenny Shiels's last game as Kilmarnock Manager.

Muirhead's playing time in the 2013–14 season soon increased with 21 appearances and scoring twice against Partick Thistle. and St Johnstone. His first team chance attracted interests from English clubs.

In the first half of the 2014–15 season, Muirhead added two more goals to his career tally, against Motherwell and St Mirren. His two goals to his tally career led Daily Record naming Muirhead as the next successor to Kris Boyd.

Dundee United
Muirhead left Kilmarnock to sign for Dundee United on the transfer deadline day for a fee of £150,000 plus add-ons, as well as signing a three-year deal. The sale of Muirhead caused the Kilmarnock manager Allan Johnston to resign in protest. Celtic was also keen to sign Muirhead, having signed Dundee United's Stuart Armstrong and Gary Mackay-Steven. Muirhead made his Dundee United debut, coming on as a substitute for Henri Anier, in a 3–2 loss against Kilmarnock. He scored his first goal for the club in a 1–0 win against Aberdeen on 2 May. He followed this up three days later with another goal, in a 2–1 defeat against Inverness Caledonian Thistle.

On 1 September 2015, Muirhead was loaned to fellow Scottish Premiership club Partick Thistle on an initial three-month deal. Muirhead scored his first and second goal, including a 30-yard strike, for Thistle in a 5–2 win on 28 November against his former club Kilmarnock. He returned to Dundee United on 4 January 2016 following the expiry of his loan period. Muirhead did not play for United after his return, and was released from his contract in April 2016.

Heart of Midlothian
Muirhead signed a one-year deal with Scottish Premiership side Heart of Midlothian in June 2016. On 30 November 2016, Muirhead scored twice in a 2–0 win over Rangers.

Milton Keynes Dons
On 19 January 2017, Muirhead signed a two-and-a-half-year deal to join English League One side Milton Keynes Dons for an undisclosed fee.

He made his debut coming on as a substitute in a 5–3 home league win over Northampton Town on 21 January 2017. On 1 April 2017, Muirhead scored his first goal for the club in a 3–2 home league win over Gillingham. On 13 March 2018, Muirhead scored twice in a 3–2 home win against Rotherham United.

Dunfermline Athletic
On 31 August 2018, Muirhead joined Scottish Championship club Dunfermline Athletic for an undisclosed fee, signing a one-year deal. He left in May 2019.

Greenock Morton
On 12 June 2019, Muirhead signed for Greenock Morton on a one-year contract. He scored his first goal for the club in a 0–5 victory against Annan Athletic in the Scottish League Cup group stages on 23 July 2019.

Muirhead would have a slow start to life at Morton, scoring very rarely for the club. He would be offered another contract by manager David Hopkin at the early end of the season brought on by the COVID-19 pandemic.

His second season in white and blue was also fairly quiet, scoring 4 goals for the season, 3 of these coming in both legs of the Championship play-off final against Airdrieonians, including a stunning 18-yard volley at Cappielow. Muirhead was promptly offered another year-long contract following this.

Muirhead started slowly again in season 2021/2022, however his form took a slight turn for the better under Manager Dougie Imrie, scoring 4 times in the second half of the season, including against Motherwell and his former club Partick Thistle. Muirhead would sign a 2 year contract in the summer of 2022.

Muirhead would finally regain his form in the 2022/2023 season, scoring his first goal of the season against Ayr United in a 2-1 home defeat, however would go on to hit the 10 goal mark in a season for the first time in his career. Muirhead was also awarded Championship Player of the Month for September/October.

International career
Muirhead has previously represented Scotland at U16, U17, U18 and U19 international levels. While playing for Scotland U19, Muirhead scored a goal that was nominated for a "goal of the season" award by UEFA. On 13 March 2018, Muirhead was called up to the Scotland U21 national team for the first time.

Career statistics

References

1996 births
Living people
Scottish footballers
Association football forwards
Scottish Premier League players
Scottish Professional Football League players
English Football League players
Kilmarnock F.C. players
Scotland youth international footballers
Footballers from Irvine, North Ayrshire
Dundee United F.C. players
Partick Thistle F.C. players
Heart of Midlothian F.C. players
Milton Keynes Dons F.C. players
Dunfermline Athletic F.C. players
Greenock Morton F.C. players